The Kenya national cricket team visited Zimbabwe in December 2002 and played a three-match series of Limited Overs Internationals (LOI) against the Zimbabwean national cricket team. Zimbabwe won the series 2–0. Kenya were captained by Thomas Odoyo and Zimbabwe by Alistair Campbell.

One Day Internationals (ODIs)

1st ODI

2nd ODI

3rd ODI

References

External links

2002 in Zimbabwean cricket
Kenyan cricket tours of Zimbabwe
International cricket competitions in 2002–03
Zimbabwean cricket seasons from 2000–01